Mount Jamanota is at  the highest point on the island of Aruba and is visible from the entire island. It is located within the Arikok National Park. Wild goats, Aruba Rattlesnake and donkeys roam free on the mountain. The panorama from its summit includes Frenchman's Pass on the south coast, where Indians defended their island against the French. The area is known for its wild parakeets.

Mountains and hills of Aruba

References